Maarten Swings (born 2 November 1988) is a Belgian speed skater (inline skating & ice) and multiple European and world Champion.

Swings, his brother Bart Swings and Ferre Spruyt formed 'Team Stressless', the first Belgian professional top speed skating team.

Inline speedskating Top results 
 2011 European Champion men's speed inline skating (on the road) 5 000 m relay race 
 2010 European Champion men's speed inline skating (on the road) 5 000 m relay race 
 2009 European Champion men's speed inline skating (on the road) 3 000 m relay race

External links
 
 Maarten Swings at speedskatingresults.com

1988 births
Living people
Belgian male speed skaters
Inline speed skaters
People from Herent
Sportspeople from Flemish Brabant